The SPARCstation ZX is a computer workstation produced by Sun Microsystems and launched in August 1993. It was end-of-lifed in March 1994. The original price was USD $19,995.00.

The SPARCstation ZX was identical to the SPARCstation LX, with the addition of a Sun ZX (also known as LEO) accelerated 3D framebuffer card. This was a double-width, double-decked SBus card providing 24-bit color and a performance of 750,000 3D vectors per second and 310,000 triangle mesh/second.

See also 
 SPARCstation
 SPARCstation LX

References
Sun-4/10/15/30 Handbook
Exciting New Graphics, Imaging And Video Solutions On Sun, SunFLASH, Vol 55 #7

Sun workstations
SPARC microprocessor products